The Ohio Department of Taxation is the administrative department of the Ohio state government responsible for collection and administration of most state taxes, several local taxes and the oversight of real property taxation.

References

External links
Official website

Taxation
Tax administration